A video blog or video log, sometimes shortened to vlog, is a form of blog for which the medium is video. Vlog entries often combine embedded video (or a video link) with supporting text, images, and other metadata. Entries can be recorded in one take or cut into multiple parts. Vlog category is popular on the video-sharing platform YouTube.

In recent years, "vlogging" has spawned a large community on social media, becoming one of the most popular forms of digital entertainment. It is popularly believed that, alongside being entertaining, vlogs can deliver deep context through imagery as opposed to written blogs.

Video logs (vlogs) also often take advantage of web syndication to allow for the distribution of video over the Internet using either the RSS or Atom syndication formats, for automatic aggregation and playback on mobile devices and personal computers (see video podcast).

History

In the 1980s, New York artist Nelson Sullivan documented his experiences travelling around New York City and South Carolina by recording videos in a distinctive vlog-like style.

On January 2, 2000, Adam Kontras posted a video alongside a blog entry aimed at informing his friends and family of his cross-country move to Los Angeles in pursuit of show business, marking the first post on what would later become the longest-running video blog in history. In November of that year, Adrian Miles posted a video of changing text on a still image, coining the term vog to refer to his video blog. Filmmaker and musician Luuk Bouwman started in 2002 the now-defunct Tropisms.org site as a video diary of his post-college travels, one of the first sites to be called a vlog or videolog. In 2004, Steve Garfield launched his own video blog and declared that year "the year of the video blog".

YouTube

Vlogging saw a strong increase in popularity beginning in 2005. The most popular video sharing site, YouTube, was founded in February 2005. The site's co-founder Jawed Karim uploaded the first YouTube vlog clip Me at the zoo on his channel "jawed" in April 2005. The ordinary "everydayness" and "dry aesthetics" of Me at the zoo set the tone for the type of amateur vlogging content that would become typical of YouTube, especially among YouTubers. By July 2006, YouTube had become the fifth most popular web destination, with 100million videos viewed daily and 65,000 new uploads per day. The Yahoo! Videoblogging Group also saw its membership increase dramatically by August 2005.

Many open source content management systems have enabled the inclusion of video content, allowing bloggers to host and administer their own video blogging sites. In addition, the convergence of mobile phones with digital cameras allows publishing of video content to the Web almost as it is recorded. Radio and television stations may use video blogging as a way to help interact more with listeners and viewers.

Throughout the lifetime of the YouTube platform, vloggers have developed large social communities by expressing emotions of vulnerability and encouraging their viewers to do the same. The effect of this emotional exchange between strangers has been documented, for example, in the popularity of bereavement vlogs, in which grieving individuals reassure each other through friendly comments.

Guinness World Record
In May 2019, Charles Trippy was awarded the Guinness World Record for the "Most Consecutive Daily Personal Video Blogs Posted On YouTube", having recorded 3653 consecutive videos to his Charles and Allie YouTube channel over the previous ten years.

VidCon
Hosted in Los Angeles, California, VidCon is an annual convention that allows YouTube content creators and viewers to come together in order to share content ideas and business contacts. The first VidCon event was held on July 10 and 11, 2010, and has now become the largest in-person gathering of Internet creators, viewers, and representatives. This convention realizes that the ways in which society entertains, educates, shares, and communicates are being revolutionized, and chooses to highlight this fact via panels, meet and greets, and talks given to audiences at the convention.

Uses

Impressions

Vlogs have made it possible to learn about a Vlogger's persona, culture, and impressions using non-verbal hints. Researchers have conducted experiments using crowdsourcing for Amazons Mechanical Turk to determine what kind of personality traits the Vlogger might have. Many Vlogs have been personified by five big personality traits such as Extraversion, Conscientiousness, Agreeableness, Neuroticism, and Openness to Experience. Along with Mechanical Turk, researchers also looked at the cues that take place within Vlogs. Vlogs can be broken down to their elements considering that there are a lot of factors that play in the creation of one such as placement of camera, lighting, location, amount of time spent looking at the camera, pitch, delivery and amount of the interactions. Using this information and crowdsourcing, results have revealed that the highest rate in personality research was Agreeableness which makes Vlogging a great place to form Agreeable impressions. However, more non-verbal hints are more noticeable in other form traits such as Extraversion. Regardless, Personality impressions have made a more interesting Vlog viewing experience.

Education

Vlogging has been experimented with school systems to determine if it is a reliable platform to deliver higher educational practices to students. Researchers have done an experiment that placed 42 college freshmen into a control and experimental group of 21 each. Oral proficiency exams were given to all students to reflect their current speech skills, after a year of teachings based on each of the groups preference. The control group was instructed to work with their standard writing skills and create their own blogs, while the Experimental group tested their skills with online interaction. Scores for both groups had increased after both tests, however the experimental group had outperformed the control group due to the improvement of speech proficiency that came as a result of a more interactive learning environment between teachers and classmates. The control group claimed that not using video blogs "lowered their confidence" in their speaking proficiency.

Health
Researchers have investigated how vlog-style YouTube videos made by creators who suffer from chronic illnesses can raise health awareness among viewers and create social communities among those suffering. A 2014 study evaluated the contextual relationship between vloggers who shared that they had diabetes, cancer, or human immunodeficiency virus (HIV) and their audiences.  Most of the creators of these vlogs chose to focus their videos on how disease diagnosis and treatment had impacted them physically and emotionally. Commenters on the vlogs who shared personal characteristics formed ad hoc small groups; these impromptu support groups expanded over time as more and more people discovered the health vlogs.

Live broadcasting 

YouTube announced a live broadcasting feature called YouTube Live in 2008. This feature was also established by other social platforms such as Instagram, Facebook and Twitch.

YouTube presence 
YouTube currently ranks among the top three most-visited sites on the web. As a high traffic area for video bloggers, or vloggers, YouTube has created a platform for these participants to present their personal videos, which oftentimes are filmed using hand held point and shoot cameras. The popularity of vlogs in the YouTube community has risen exponentially in the past few years; out of the top 100 most subscribed YouTube channels, 17 provide vlogs as their primary style of footage.  Many of these vloggers are a part of the YouTube Partner Program, which professionalizes the industry and allows for monetary gain from video production. This professionalization additionally helps increase exposure to various channels as well as creates a sense of stability within the field. Additionally, this professionalization allows content creators to be deemed a credible source by their viewers. Furthermore, many vloggers have been able to turn their channels into sustainable careers; in 2013, the highest paid vlogger brought in a minimum of $720,000 for the year. Hollywood is taking notice of this rising medium, and has placed its value ranked over other entertainment companies such as Marvel, which is also owned by Disney.

Vlogumentary
I'm Vlogging Here is a 90-minute "vlogumentary" that focuses on documenting the world of video blogging and centers on YouTube vloggers that have found success in using this medium.  Starring YouTube personality Shay Carl and his family of ShayTards, this film, to be released in late 2016, follows a family whose lives have been drastically altered by vlogging, as their day-to-day lives are documented and uploaded for the world to see. Shay Carl is a co-founder of Maker Studios, a YouTube based video supplier bought out by The Walt Disney Company. The involvement of larger corporations outside of the Internet industries is a primary example of the ever-increasing need for a strong front on the digital side of one's company. This documentary is being created by a group with links to the YouTube community in hopes that it will spark interest and raise awareness of the impact that vlogging and the digital community are having on the entertainment industry.

Miscellaneous events

 2005, January – Vloggercon, the first vlogger conference, is held in New York City.
 2006, November – Irina Slutsky created and hosted The Vloggies, the first annual video blog awards.
 2007, May and August – The Wall Street Journal places a grandmother on the front page of its Personal Journal section. In August 2007, she was featured on an ABC World News Tonight segment showing the elderly now becoming involved in the online video world.

See also
 History of blogging
 Lifecasting (video stream)
 Livestream
 Photoblog
 Parasocial interaction
 Video podcast

References

External links

 A Certain Tendency in Videoblogging and Rethinking the Rebirth of the Author, academic essay on videoblogging
 A Post-Cinema of Distractions: On the Genealogical Constitution of Personal Videoblogging, academic essay on videoblogging
 ASL Vlog & Video Directory

 
Film and video technology

.
Web syndication
Technology in society
Articles containing video clips
American inventions
Bangladeshi inventions
German inventions